Belfast Township may refer to the following townships in the United States:

 Belfast Township, Murray County, Minnesota
 Belfast Township, Fulton County, Pennsylvania